J. C. Jones (born 1973) is an American country music artist. Jones was signed to a recording deal with Rising Tide Records and released his debut album, One Night, in 1998. His only single, the album's title track, peaked at No. 61 on the Billboard Hot Country Singles & Tracks chart. When Rising Tide closed in March 1998, he no longer had a record label deal.

The "One Night" single was produced by Emory Gordy Jr. and Steve Fishell, and written by Lewis Storey, Rick Carnes, and Janis Carnes. Billboard Singles review said "the melody was pretty… an appealing Mexicali flavor… delicate guitar intro" and Jones had a "self-assured performance" adding, "There's a vaguely familiar quality to his voice, but at the same time you can't really name anyone he sounds like. It's a quality that could work in his favor."

One Night (1998)

Track listing
"You've Got Something I Want" (Butch Baker, Shawna Harrington, Wade Kirby) - 3:39
"The Best I Can Do" (Burton Collins, Tom Conner) - 3:44
"Tenderness" (Brent Maher, Jamie O'Hara) - 3:57
"Angels with One Wing" (Pat Alger, Richard Leigh) - 3:01
"Forever's a Moment in Your Eyes" (Emory Gordy Jr., John Hobbs, J. C. Jones) - 4:24
"How Do You Do What You Do So Well" (Benmont Tench, Craig Wiseman) - 3:09
"One Night" (Rick Carnes, Janis Carnes, Lewis Storey) - 3:48
"Rain on a Tin Roof" (Gary Harrison, James House) - 3:44
"The Power of Love" (Mary Susan Applegate, Candy Derouge, Gunther Mende, Jennifer Rush) - 4:48
"Master of the Game" (Steve Dean, Sean Michaels) - 2:53
"What Color Am I?" (Troy McConnell) - 4:05

Singles

Music videos

References

External links
[ AllMusic ((( J. C. Jones > Overview )))]

1973 births
American country singer-songwriters
American male singer-songwriters
Living people
Rising Tide Records artists
21st-century American singers
21st-century American male singers
Country musicians from California
Singer-songwriters from California